This is a list of mayors of Eindhoven since 1920. In 2022, five surrounding municipalities merged into the municipality of Eindhoven, thus creating the municipality in its current shape.

References 

Eindhoven